Rashid Khan (born 15 February 1991) is an Indian professional golfer.

As an amateur, Khan played on the Indian team that won the silver medal at the 2010 Asian Games.

Khan turned professional later that year and has played on the Professional Golf Tour of India (PGTI) since 2011. He finished third on the Order of Merit (money list) in 2011, second in 2012, and first in 2013. He has won four times on the PGTI.

Khan began playing on the Asian Tour in 2012. He had two top-10 finishes in five events in 2013 and won his first event of the 2014 season at the SAIL-SBI Open.

Professional wins (13)

Asian Tour wins (2)

1Co-sanctioned by the Professional Golf Tour of India

Asian Tour playoff record (1–2)

Professional Golf Tour of India wins (11)

1Co-sanctioned by the Asian Tour

Other wins (1)
2019 Tata Steel PGTI Feeder Tour

Team appearances
Amateur
Eisenhower Trophy (representing India): 2008, 2010

References

External links

Rashid Khan at the PGTI official site

Indian male golfers
Asian Tour golfers
Asian Games medalists in golf
Asian Games silver medalists for India
Golfers at the 2010 Asian Games
Medalists at the 2010 Asian Games
Golfers from Delhi
Indian Muslims
People from New Delhi
1991 births
Living people